This is a bibliography of articles and books by or about the director and film critic Jacques Rivette.

Articles by Rivette

Bulletin du ciné-club du quartier Latin

La Gazette du cinéma

Cahiers du cinéma

Arts Magazine

Other works

Books

Books about Rivette

Books about the French New Wave

Books with descriptions of Rivette

Films about Rivette

See also

References

External links
 Rivette&rech_mode=contient&pageF=1&pageP=1 cineressources.net listing of works (in French)

Jacques Rivette
Books about film directors
Bibliographies of people
Bibliographies by writer